The  is an armoured vehicle that entered service with Japan in 1987. It investigates and measures radiation and contamination conditions in situations where nuclear or chemical weapons have been used. Developed by redesigning the Type 82 Command and Communication Vehicle, it was officially adopted in 1987.

By 2009, more than 30 vehicles have been produced, mainly deployed in chemical departments such as the Central Special Weapon Protection Corps (Omiya Garrison), Special Weapon Protection Corps and Chemical Protection Platoon in each division and brigade. Manufactured by Komatsu Limited, procurement price was listed at approximately 200 million yen in 2009.

Notes 

Japan Ground Self-Defense Force
Armoured personnel carriers of the post–Cold War period
Post–Cold War military equipment of Japan
Armoured personnel carriers of Japan
Komatsu Limited
Six-wheeled vehicles
Military vehicles introduced in the 1980s